Bush Baby may refer to:

 Galago, also known as bush babies, small nocturnal primates
 Bush Baby (album), an album by Arthur Blythe
 The Bush Baby, a 1992 anime series